The Business of Genocide: The SS, Slave Labor, and the Concentration Camps is a book by Michael Thad Allen which focuses on the SS Main Economic and Administrative Office and its role in the Nazi concentration camps and slave labor of Nazi Germany.

References

2002 non-fiction books
History books about the Holocaust
University of North Carolina Press books
SS Main Economic and Administrative Office